HMS Squirrel was built for the Royal Navy as a coast guard vessel, commissioned in 1905 to replace the previous . She was built at Belfast by Workman, Clark and Company as yard number 215, launched on 21 December 1904 and completed early in 1905. She was armed with two 3-pounder guns.

The coastguard role continued until 1917, when she became a cable vessel.

Surplus to requirements, Squirrel was sold on 16 November 1921 to the Sunderland Pilotage Authority for conversion to the pilot tender Vedra. Registered in 1923 at Sunderland with Official Number 146924, she was measured as 158 GRT and 52 NRT.  In the mid-1930s several attempts were made to sell Vedra, and in 1936 Thomas Young & Sons (Shipbreakers) Ltd purchased her for local demolition.  However, she was resold to Captain Vernon Sewell for use during the making of the Michael Powell film The Edge of the World in Scotland during 1937.  Thereafter Vedra was sold to foreign owners and renamed, but again became a British ship in 1938 as the yacht Sea-Serpent, registered at Famagusta, Cyprus, then a British colony. Sea-Serpent was reported sunk on 22 April 1941 by German aircraft between Syros and Souda.

References

 

 

1904 ships
Ships built in Belfast
Cable ships of the United Kingdom
Maritime incidents in April 1941
Ships sunk by German aircraft
World War II shipwrecks in the Aegean Sea
Shipwrecks of Greece